Luboš Kubík (born 20 January 1964) is a Czech former professional footballer and former manager of Torquay United, who played libero for the Czechoslovakia and Czech Republic national teams, winning 56 caps in total, and a number of notable clubs. He is currently an assistant coach with the United States men's national soccer team.

Playing career 
Kubík was born in Vysoké Mýto, Pardubice Region and began his career in 1981 with Hradec Králové, and moved to local powers Slavia Prague the following year. He made his international debut for Czechoslovakia in 1985. In 1989, he was bought by Serie A club Fiorentina, and played there for two years. He moved to Ligue 1 club FC Metz in 1991, and then to Bundesliga team 1. FC Nürnberg in 1993, before returning to the Czech Republic with Drnovice FK, SK Slavia Prague, and AFK Lázně Bohdaneč.

Kubík moved to Major League Soccer in 1998, joining the expansion team Chicago Fire. While helping the Fire to win both the MLS Cup and the U.S. Open Cup in their inaugural year, Kubík was named the MLS Defender of the Year. Kubík continued to be a valuable attacking force from the back in 1999, registering 5 goals and 8 assists, and was named in the MLS Best XI for a second time.

The Fire traded Kubík to the Dallas Burn during the 2001 offseason in exchange for Sergi Daniv. Kubík's final year was again beset by injuries, and he only managed to play 11 games for the Burn. Kubík retired due to injury at the end of the 2001 MLS season and returned to the Czech Republic.

Kubík was also a stalwart for the Czechoslovakian and Czech Republic's national teams, representing Czechoslovakia in the 1990 FIFA World Cup and the Czech Republic in Euro 96. He played in his last international game in 1997.

Coaching and managerial career 
Kubík had a brief spell working for Hradec Králové and in the summer of 2006 was appointed as manager of Polish side Śląsk Wrocław. However, he was sacked in October 2006 after just 11 league games in charge.

He was appointed manager of the English Football League Two side Torquay United on 27 November 2006 through his close friendship with Torquay chairman Chris Roberts. Despite his impressive playing career, his lack of managerial experience and contacts in England was a problem, not aided by Roberts appointing Richard Hancox as Kubik's assistant. Torquay struggled under Kubik, winning just twice in 15 games, and he left club by mutual consent on 5 February 2007, with Torquay deep in relegation trouble. Roberts also resigned as chairman later that month. Torquay would be relegated at the end of the season, ending a 79-year spell in the Football League.

References

External links 
 
 

Living people
1964 births
People from Vysoké Mýto
Association football midfielders
Czech footballers
Czech football managers
Czech expatriate football managers
Czechoslovak footballers
Czech Republic international footballers
Czechoslovakia international footballers
1. FC Nürnberg players
ACF Fiorentina players
Chicago Fire FC players
FC Dallas players
FC Hradec Králové players
FC Metz players
FK Drnovice players
SK Slavia Prague players
AFK Atlantic Lázně Bohdaneč players
Torquay United F.C. managers
Śląsk Wrocław managers
Bundesliga players
2. Bundesliga players
Czech First League players
Ligue 1 players
Serie A players
1990 FIFA World Cup players
UEFA Euro 1996 players
Czech expatriate footballers
Czech expatriate sportspeople in Italy
Czech expatriate sportspeople in Germany
Czech expatriate sportspeople in the United States
Czech expatriate sportspeople in France
Czech expatriate sportspeople in Poland
Expatriate football managers in England
Expatriate football managers in Poland
Expatriate footballers in France
Expatriate footballers in Germany
Expatriate footballers in Italy
Major League Soccer players
Major League Soccer All-Stars
Czechoslovak expatriate footballers
Czechoslovak expatriate sportspeople in France
Czechoslovak expatriate sportspeople in Italy
Expatriate soccer players in the United States
Sportspeople from the Pardubice Region